Jorge Luis Valdés Berriel (born February 12, 1961) is a Cuban baseball player and Olympic gold medalist.

Valdés is a one time Gold medalist for baseball, winning at the 1992 Summer Olympics.

References 
 
 

1961 births
Living people
Olympic baseball players of Cuba
Olympic gold medalists for Cuba
Olympic medalists in baseball
Medalists at the 1992 Summer Olympics
Baseball players at the 1992 Summer Olympics
Pan American Games gold medalists for Cuba
Baseball players at the 1991 Pan American Games
Pan American Games medalists in baseball
Central American and Caribbean Games gold medalists for Cuba
Central American and Caribbean Games silver medalists for Cuba
Competitors at the 1982 Central American and Caribbean Games
Competitors at the 1986 Central American and Caribbean Games
Competitors at the 1990 Central American and Caribbean Games
Competitors at the 1993 Central American and Caribbean Games
Goodwill Games medalists in baseball
Central American and Caribbean Games medalists in baseball
Competitors at the 1990 Goodwill Games
Medalists at the 1991 Pan American Games